Nifçi (also, Nifchi) is a village and municipality in the Barda Rayon of Azerbaijan.  It has a population of 259.

References

Populated places in Barda District